The Road to Reno is the title of two films:

 The Road to Reno (1931 film), a drama
 The Road to Reno (1938 film), a screwball comedy